Naya Daur is a 1978 Hindi film directed by Mahesh Bhatt. The film stars Rishi Kapoor, Bhavana Bhatt, Danny Denzongpa, Farida Jalal, Ranjeet, Madan Puri, Om Prakash in pivotal roles. The assistant director was Moeen Amjad. Music was composed by R. D. Burman, lyrics by Anand Bakshi.

Cast
 Rishi Kapoor as Mahesh Chopra
 Bhavana Bhatt as Kiran Mehta
 Danny Denzongpa as Mark
 Farida Jalal as Jenny
 Ranjeet as Ronnie
 Madan Puri as Mr. Mehta
 Om Prakash as Mr. Chopra
 Purnima as Shanti Chopra
 Shreeram Lagoo as Jenny's Father 
 Paintal as Mangu
 Pinchoo Kapoor as Dharamdas
 D. K. Sapru as Hotel Manager
 Sharat Saxena as Ronnie's Goon
 Raj Tilak as Ronnie's Goon
 Leena Das as Cabaret Dancer

Soundtrack 
All songs were written by Anand Bakshi.

External links
 

1978 films
1970s Hindi-language films
Films scored by R. D. Burman
Films directed by Mahesh Bhatt